Dongbaek station is a railroad station in South Korea.

 Dongbaek station (Busan Metro)
 Dongbaek station (Yongin)